Freya Olivia Rose Ridings (born 19 April 1994) is an English singer, songwriter and multi-instrumentalist. Ridings rose to prominence in 2017 with her ballad, "Lost Without You", which became a top ten hit on the UK Singles Chart. She followed this with the release of her debut extended play, You Mean the World to Me (2019). Her self-titled debut album was supported by the single "Castles", which would become her international breakthrough.

Early life
Ridings was raised in North London and grew up in Palmers Green. She is the daughter of British actor and musician Richard Ridings, and learned guitar from watching him play. She attended St Christopher School in Letchworth, followed by the BRIT School from the age of 16.

Career

Ridings released her debut single, "Blackout", on 5 May 2017. She released the single "Maps" on 30 June 2017. On 22 September 2017 she released her debut live album Live at St Pancras Old Church. After releasing the album she went on to her first full headline tour in the UK. She spent most of 2017 supporting the likes of Tears for Fears, Tash Sultana and Lewis Capaldi. She released "Lost Without You" on 3 November 2017. The song peaked at number 9 in the UK Singles Chart, after being featured on the reality show Love Island in July 2018. It was subsequently chosen by Scott Mills' as his 'Tune of the Week' on his Radio 1 show in August 2018. She released her second live album, Live at Omeara, on 30 March 2018. She released the single "Ultraviolet" on 15 June 2018.

In 2019, she released the single "You Mean the World to Me", which was re-produced by Greg Kurstin, followed by an extended play of the same name. She also announced her self-titled debut album, with an original release date of 31 May 2019, but it was pushed back to 19 July 2019.

On June 29 2019, Ridings played a set on the Glastonbury John Peel stage, after the festival founder Michael Eavis personally attended one of her concerts in Bristol.

In March 2020, Ridings toured Australia for the first time, performing shows in Sydney and Melbourne.

In January 2023, Ridings released her first new single in three years, titled "Weekends". This was followed by the announcement that her second studio album, "Blood Orange", will be released on 5 May 2023.

Discography

Studio albums

Live albums

Extended plays

Singles

Promotional singles

Notes

References

External links

 Homepage
 Freya Ridings, Bintang Baru dari Britania on Cultura Magazine

1994 births
Living people
21st-century English singers
21st-century English women singers
English women singer-songwriters
People educated at St Christopher School, Letchworth
People educated at the BRIT School
People from Palmers Green
Singers from London